Than Than Aye was a Burmese model and beauty pageant titleholder who was crowned Miss Burma 1959. She was the Burma's first contestant in the Miss Universe pageant.

In 1959 , the term Miss Burma was introduced in Myanmar through MISS ORGANIZATION and the Miss Burma pageant was held. At the end of the event, Than Than Aye was competed in Miss Burma 1959. In that year, she represented Myanmar as the first contestant in the Miss Universe pageant. She competed in the Miss Universe 1959 which was held on 24 July 1959 at Long Beach Municipal Auditorium in Long Beach, California, United States. At the end of the event, she was unplaced.

References

Burmese beauty pageant winners
Burmese female models
Miss Universe Myanmar winners
Miss Universe 1959 contestants